MTV Philippines was a 24-hour music/entertainment television network owned by All Youth Channels, Inc., through a partnership with MTV Networks Asia Pacific. The network originally started its broadcast on January 1, 2001. Two other MTV-branded networks carrying domestic its final broadcast on March 20, 2011, content have since struggled to stay on the air through the 2010s, neither lasting more than four years.

Prior to its last incarnation, MTV Philippines was a corporate venture between MTV Networks Asia and Nation Broadcasting Corporation. MTV Networks Asia provided much of the broadcast content, while NBC provided the infrastructure.

MTV Philippines' facilities were located at the Citibank Center in Makati, The Richmonde Hotel in Ortigas Center, Pasig, The Fort in Bonifacio Global City, Taguig, and Silver City in Frontera Verde, Ortigas Avenue, Pasig.

History

MTV Asia in the Philippines on UHF Channel 23
MTV started in the Philippines in May 1992 as MTV Asia. It started as one of the channels of the STAR group—a partnership of Viacom, MTV's parent company, and STAR TV. It began airing on UHF Channel 23 licensed to Ermita Electronics Corporation, the country's first UHF TV station fully devoted to re-broadcasting from a foreign satellite channel. In 1994, the partnership suffered a conflict of interest when STAR launched its own music channel, Channel V. After UHF 23 was put off-air in July 1996, the frequency was reassigned to ABS-CBN through a subsidiary, AMCARA Broadcasting Network, and has been rebranded as Studio 23. However, Studio 23 had to deal with the then-active agreement between Ermita Electronics and MTV Asia (whose main broadcast headquarters is located in Singapore).

Studio 23
By October 12, 1996, MTV was being aired on Studio 23 (now known as ABS-CBN Sports+Action in 2014) during daytime hours, while original Studio 23 programming aired on primetime. The partnership with Studio 23 ended on December 31, 2000, and moved to a new channel frequency, UHF 41. ABS-CBN earlier launched its own music channel, Myx on November 20, 2000, and later became Studio 23's daytime block on January 1, 2001.

MTV UHF Channel 41 / MTV Philippines
Before 2000 was about to end, MTV Networks Asia and Nation Broadcasting Corporation (NBC) signed a joint-venture agreement to form Music Source, and acquired the rights to air MTV 24 hours a day on UHF Channel 41, which was licensed to NBC.

MTV Philippines showcased local Filipino talent through videos and shows presented in-between numbers featuring international pop and rock superstars. The channel did not promote a pan-Asian format. However, MTV Southeast Asia presented Indonesian, Malaysian and Singaporean artists on their network, alternating with international pop and rock talents. Within six months from its inception on January 1, 2001, it immediately won the hearts of pop-culturally conscious young Filipino viewers. It was said that the presence of this channel eventually caused the demise of Channel V Philippines simply due to intense competition.

After six years of partnership, UHF Channel 41 ceased broadcasting on December 31, 2006, following the dissolution of the joint venture. Soon, it was returned on TV broadcasting with a brand new channel co-owned by TV5 as Aksyon TV Channel 41, an all-news channel, which would then become 5 Plus in 2019.

All Youth Channels, Inc. and the final incarnation of MTV Philippines
After the dissolution of its joint venture with NBC, MTV Networks Asia signed a licensing agreement with All Youth Channels, Inc. (AYC), which is run by some of the members of Music Source, including Lumen, to control both MTV Philippines and its sister channel, Nickelodeon. AYC owned and operated 100% of then-new MTV Philippines.

MTV Philippines was an exclusive channel on cable and satellite television systems. However, Lumen decided not to renew the contract (except Nickelodeon Philippines, which is MTV Philippines's sister channel). There were also some posts claiming that instead of funding for MTV Philippines, they would support TV5 instead which they planned to be the next big thing on TV. 11 minutes before midnight of February 16, 2010, a final music video: "Video Killed the Radio Star" by The Buggles, (which was the very first music video played in MTV USA back in 1981) was played and afterwards, MTV Philippines officially signed off. After the closure, it had reverted to its original channel, MTV Asia.

MTV Pinoy

On February 14, 2014, MTV returned to the country as MTV Pinoy with a new logo and name.  At exactly 04:00 P.M., MTV Pinoy started its commercial operations with its first program MTV Halo-Halo with VJ Sam. "Dear Lonely" performed by Zia Quizon is the first music video to air on the relaunched channel. MTV Pinoy was co-owned by MTV Networks Asia Pacific and Viva Communications, with the latter providing the infrastructure.

However, unlike its MTV Philippines format, MTV Pinoy was a domestic network focused on Filipino pop music, with programs aligned with the Viva-produced content. It struggled against the dominant network Myx, and shutdown on December 31, 2016, after a New Year's Eve countdown.

MTV ph

On August 1, 2017,  MTV returned for the third time as MTVph, a joint venture between MTVNAP and new partner Solar. Like the original networks, it was wholly unsuccessful, and the domestic feed ended on January 1, 2019, replaced by MTV Asia.

Key people
Bill Roedy - President, MTV Networks International
 Frank Brown - President, MTV Networks Asia Pacific
Steven Tan - Executive Vice President, MTV Networks Asia
Francis Lumen - President and CEO, All Youth Channel, Inc.

Programming
Most of the programming consists of music/music-related shows, mainly broadcasting programming from the US-based MTV and VH1. The network also acquired original content from MTV Southeast Asia, as well as its own localized content.

Events
MTV Philippines became the official music media channel of the big-name concerts to the Philippines since their re-launch.

International artists
Christina Aguilera
George Benson
Chris Brown
Duran Duran
Fall Out Boy
Josh Groban
Incubus
Alicia Keys
Beyoncé Knowles
Lady Gaga*
M2M
Ziggy Marley
My Chemical Romance
Nine Inch Nails
Katy Perry*
Pussycat Dolls
Marion Raven
Rihanna
Tortured Soul
Vertical Horizon

Local artists
Eraserheads
Sarah Geronimo
Imago
Kyla
Martin Nievera
Moonstar88
Sinosikat?
Spongecola
Urbandub
Gary Valenciano
Ogie Alcasid
Regine Velasquez

* - MTV Philippines was only the official music channel of the concert.

MTV Philippines also announced that an awards show would be in the works. In the upcoming years, the network hopes to relaunch the MTV Pilipinas Video Music Awards to continue its tradition of recognizing the best of Pinoy music and video making.

MTV Philippines' past VJs
Marc Abaya
Kat Alano (2007–2009)
Bianca Araneta
Victor Basa (2007–2008)
Paolo Bediones
Reema Chanco
KC Concepcion
Anne Curtis (2007)
Johan Ekedum (2003–2004)
Maike Evers
Nicole Fonacier (2005–2006)
John Joe Joseph (2004–2006)
Cindy Kurleto
Patty Laurel (2003–2004)
Cesca Litton
Francis Magalona †
Andi Manzano (2007–2009)
Sarah Meier (2001–2005)
Colby Miller (2005–2007)
KC Montero (1999–2007)
Rex Navarrete
Claire Olivar
Belinda Panelo
Don Puno
Derek Ramsay (2001–2002)
Mariel Rodriguez
Eiffelene Salvador
Anna Shier (2001–2003)
Sib Sibulo
Chase Tinio
Giselle Toengi-Walters
Regine Tolentino
Shannen Torres (1997–2002)
Donita Rose
Jamie Wilson (1997–1998)
Maggie Wilson (2007–2010)

Shows

Programs formerly broadcast by MTV Philippines (on cable TV)

Final
After Hours
Arctic Monkeys Live with Zane
Auto Extreme
Box Set
The City
Cribs
Exiled
The Fave Five
Handpicked
Hanging with The Boys
The Hills
Man and Machine
MTV European Music Awards
MTV Fantastic Females (1998-2000)
MTV Gimme 10
MTV Live
MTV Push
MTV Sessions
MTV Time Out
MTV Video Music Awards
My Super Sweet 16
Nitro Circus
Paris Hilton's My New BFF
The Playlist
Roll Out
Spanking New Sessions
Square Roots: The Story of SpongeBob SquarePants
Teen Cribs
Tong Hits
World Stage
The X-Effect

Former
All Things Rock
Beavis and Butt Head
Boiling Points
Celebrity Deathmatch
Celebrity Rap Superstar
MTV Hangout
The Playlist
MTV Presents
MTV Roll-Out
MTV's Little Talent Show
Newport Harbor
Pimp My Ride
Punk'd
Room 401
TRL (Total Request Live)
Trick It Out
Uploaded
"What's The Word?!" Online Blog w/ Aaron Gonzales
Wrestling Society X

Partnerships/affiliations
ABS-CBN Corporation
All Youth Channels, Inc.
Ermita Electronics Corporation
Globe Telecom
GMA Network Inc.
Music Management International
Nation Broadcasting Corporation
Paramount Networks EMEAA
Smart Communications
Solar Entertainment Corporation
Viva Communications

See also
 Viacom
 MTV Networks Asia Pacific
 MTV
 MTV Southeast Asia
 MTV Pinoy
 U92 (Now Radyo5 92.3 News FM)
 AksyonTV (defunct)
 5 Plus (defunct)
 One Sports
 Myx
 Channel V Philippines (defunct)

References

Official website
 MTV Philippines official website (defunct)
 MTV Asia official website

Nation Broadcasting Corporation
MTV channels
Defunct television networks in the Philippines
Television channels and stations established in 1992
Television channels and stations disestablished in 2010
Music organizations based in the Philippines
Defunct music video networks